Charlie Chan at the Opera is considered by many to be the best Warner Oland Charlie Chan film, probably due to the presence of Boris Karloff as the principal suspect, as well as faux operatic music composed by Oscar Levant. This is the 13th film starring Oland as Chan; it was directed by H. Bruce Humberstone for 20th Century-Fox in 1936.

Oland and Demarest also appeared in The Jazz Singer (1927).

Plot 
Charlie Chan (Warner Oland) gets a chance to watch a popular opera performance. For seven years, opera star Gravelle (Boris Karloff) has been locked in an insane asylum, his identity a mystery – even to himself. But when his memory unexpectedly returns, he begins to recall that his wife and her lover tried to murder him – and now he's determined to make them face the music. Gravelle escapes from the asylum and makes his way to the San Marco opera house and begins hiding out in the various rooms and passageways. Soon, members of the opera company are being murdered one by one.

Chan soon investigates the killings and despite the presence of Gravelle, there are other suspects who may be the real killer. The suspects, excluding Gravelle, include Lilli Rochelle, the opera company's prima donna who has been having a secret affair with Enrico Barelli, the baritone; Mr. Whitely, Madame Rochelle's husband who has warned Barelli to stay away from his wife; Anita Barelli, the opera company's number two soprano who has learned of her husband's affair with Lilli Rochelle; and Phil Childers, the fiancée of Lilli's unacknowledged daughter who has been refused permission to marry the daughter.

Clues found by Chan to apprehend the killer include a torn newspaper, a charred note, a heel mark on a newspaper picture, and a bloodstained belt. Among the questions asked are who has been threatening Lilli Rochelle's life, the mystery man in Barelli's dressing room before he is murdered, and why does Chan insist that the opera be performed twice in one evening?

Cast 
 Warner Oland as Charlie Chan
 Boris Karloff as Gravelle
 Keye Luke as Lee Chan, (Chan's "Number 1 Son")
 Charlotte Henry as Mlle. Kitty
 William Demarest as Sergeant Kelly
 Guy Usher as Inspector Regan
 Margaret Irving as Lilli Rochelle
 Gregory Gaye as Enrico Borelli
 Nedda Harrigan as Anita Borelli
 Frank Conroy as Mr. Whitely
 Stanley Blystone as Backstage Cop (uncredited)
 Gladden James as Secretary (uncredited)

Levant composed the music for the onscreen opera Carnival. Future Number 3 Son Tommy Chan actor Benson Fong is an opera extra.

References

External links

1936 films
1936 drama films
1930s mystery drama films
American black-and-white films
Charlie Chan films
Films about opera
20th Century Fox films
Films directed by H. Bruce Humberstone
Films with screenplays by Bess Meredyth
American mystery drama films
1930s English-language films
1930s American films